Geelong Football Club is a professional Australian rules football club based in Geelong, Victoria. The club itself was established in 1859, and has participated in the Australian Football League (AFL), the top-level men's competition, since its formation in 1897. Following the inaugural season of the related AFL Women's (AFLW) league in 2017, Geelong was granted a licence to join the AFLW as an expansion club, and played its first match in this league during the opening round of the 2019 season.

In preparation for the club's entry into the league, Geelong were provided with a range of recruitment concessions, including early access to existing clubs' players prior to the league's signing period, and additional selections in the 2018 national draft.

The playing list size for each AFLW club in the upcoming 2020 season will be set at 30 players, with up to three of these players listed as rookies. Rookie players must not have played with any Australian rules football club within the prior three years. As every club is required to make a minimum number of changes to its list at the end of each season, not every player necessarily makes a senior appearance for the club before being removed from the playing list.

Since its first competitive appearance, 53 players have represented the club in an AFLW premiership match.

Players

Other listed players

See also 
List of Geelong Football Club players

Notes

References

External links 
 Geelong – Every Player from AustralianFootball.com

 
AFLW
Geelong